Montgomery County Infirmary is a health facility in Llanfair Road, Newtown, Powys, Wales. It is managed by the Powys Teaching Health Board.

History
The facility was established in a private house in 1868 and, after a major fund-raining campaign for a new building, moved into expanded facilities in Llanfair Road in 1911. It joined the National Health Service in 1948 and subsequently evolved to become a community hospital.

References

Hospitals in Powys
Hospitals established in 1868
1868 establishments in Wales
Hospital buildings completed in 1868
NHS hospitals in Wales
Powys Teaching Health Board